Wymondham Abbey (pronounced Windum) is the Anglican parish church for the town of Wymondham in Norfolk, England.

History
The monastery was founded in 1107 by William d'Aubigny, Butler (Pincerna) to King Henry I. William was a prominent Norfolk landowner, with estates in Wymondham and nearby New Buckenham. The d'Albini (or d'Aubigny) family originated from St. Martin d'Aubigny in Normandy. 

William d'Albini's monastery was a dependency of the Benedictine monastery at St Albans, where his uncle Richard was Abbot. The foundation charter stipulated that the prior, as a token of dependence, was to pay a mark of silver yearly to the abbot on the festival of St. Alban. If the priory should become an abbey, then all tokens of subjection to St. Albans would cease. Wymondham Priory was relatively small, initially for some twelve Benedictine monks, but grew in influence and wealth over the coming centuries. William de Albini, the founder, and Maud his wife, who was the daughter of Roger Bigod, and sister of Hugh Bigod, 1st Earl of Norfolk, richly endowed the priory with lands, churches, tithes, and rents.

The monastery church was completed by about 1130, and originally was dedicated to the Virgin Mary. Later, following the murder of Thomas Becket in 1170, Becket's name was added to the dedication. Archaeological excavation in 2002 disclosed indications of a Late Saxon or Norman church beneath the nave of the current church. In 1174, the founder's son, also called William d'Aubigny, established a chapel in the town dedicated to Becket and served by two monks from the priory. 

In the time of Stephen, King of England, the prior obtained the grant of a three days' fair at Wymondham on the eve, day and morrow of the Nativity of the Blessed Virgin, and also a confirmation of the weekly market. William d'Aubigny, 3rd Earl of Arundel joined in the Fifth Crusade and died on his journey home, in Caneill, Italy, near Rome, on 1 February 1221. He was brought home and buried at Wymondham Abbey.  In 1349, both the prior and sub-prior died of the pestilence. Seven of the monks of St. Albans and its cells joined the crusade in Flanders in 1383, under Henry le Despenser, bishop of Norwich. Among them was William York of Wymondham Priory. The prior of Hatfield Peverel, in Essex, who was one of the number, died in Flanders; the rest returned, but none of them regained their former health, having suffered much from the heat and from foul water. Thomas Walsingham was appointed prior in 1394.

Disputes between the Wymondham and St. Albans monks were quite common, and in 1448, following a successful petition to the king, the Pope granted Wymondham the right to become an Abbey in its own right. The Vicar of Wymondham was appointed by the Abbot. After a visitation in October, 1492 which found numerous irregularities, such as the buildings of the dorter and farm not repaired; that after prime, the brothers mix with the seculars in the south part of the church; that the brothers were not in cloister at the customary hours; and that they did not exercise themselves in the study of letters but were too fond of ease Bishop Goldwell replaced the abbot.

King Henry VIII's Dissolution of the Monasteries brought about the closure of Wymondham Abbey, which was surrendered to the King in 1538. The monks had, apparently willingly, already signed the Oath of Supremacy, and were given generous pensions.

Architecture  
The church was originally cruciform in shape, with a central tower and twin west towers. When it was built, Caen stone in Normandy was shipped specially across the English channel to face the walls. The central tower was replaced in about 1376 by a tall octagonal tower (now ruined), which held the monks' bells. In 1447, work on a much taller single west tower began. This replaced the original Norman towers and held the townspeople's bells. From the start, the church had been divided between monks' and townspeople's areas, with the nave and north aisle serving as parish church for the town. This, too, was from time to time the cause of disputes which occasionally erupted into conflict. 

The years following the Dissolution saw the gradual demolition of the monastic buildings for re-use of the stone. The eastern end of the church (blocked off from the nave by a solid wall since about 1385) was destroyed, leaving the present church (at 70 m.) only about half its original length. Repairs to the church were carried out following Queen Elizabeth I's visit in 1573 (date and initials may be seen on exterior stonework).

Notable features of the church are the twin towers (a landmark for miles around), the Norman nave, the 15th-century angel roof in the nave and fine north-aisle roof.  The west tower houses a peal of 10 bells, re-cast and re-hung in 1967. Hung in the bell tower are six well-preserved 18th-century hatchments.

Interior

The church is also remarkable for its high quality fittings such as the 1783 organ by James Davis and 1810 chamber organ (also by James Davis) and the splendid gilded reredos or altar screen, one of the largest works of Sir Ninian Comper. This was dedicated in  1921 as a war memorial, though the gilding was not finished until 1934. 

Also of note is the early Tudor terracotta sedilia, a memorial to Elisha Ferrers, the last Abbot and later Vicar of Wymondham; the Georgian candelabrum and Royal Arms of George II, the carved medieval font with modern gilded font cover, and many smaller features such as angels, musicians and figures carved on the roof timbers and corbels.

A modern icon panel by the late Rev. David Hunter is on display in the church and tells the story of Becket's life.

Burials at the Abbey
William d'Aubigny (died 1139)
William d'Aubigny, 1st Earl of Arundel
William d'Aubigny, 2nd Earl of Arundel
William d'Aubigny, 3rd Earl of Arundel
William d'Aubigny, 4th Earl of Arundel
Hugh d'Aubigny, 5th Earl of Arundel

Present day
The Church of St Mary and St Thomas of Canterbury serves as the parish church of Wymondham. A wide range of services for worship take place, including Sunday Mass, Daily Morning Prayer and Evening Prayer.

It is an active parish with a Friends group and is taking part in the Warm Spaces Initiative in 2022. There is also much interest in the history of the building and parish, with an archivist and a Preservation Trust in operation.

Organ
A specification of the organ can be found on the National Pipe Organ Register.

List of organists

Richard Sharp 1793 - 1801
George Warnes 1828 - 1843
Reuben Warnes 1844 - 1848
Mrs Warnes 1849 - 1851
George Church 1852 - 1857
Horace Hill 1857 - 1867
Arthur Glasspoole 1867 - 1880
James Harcourt 1880 - 1881 (formerly organist of St Peter Mancroft, Norwich)
Algernon Wilde 1882 - 1929
L. Hemingway 1929 - 1930
Geoffrey Palmer 1930 - 1946
Winifred Stubbs 1940 - 1955
N. Charleton-Burdon 1955 - 1956
Robert Norton 1956 - 1957
N. Charleton-Burdon 1957 - 1960
Michael Bryan Hesford 1960 - 1964
Norman Crowhurst 1964 - 1967
Maxwell Betts 1967 - 1981
Ralph Cupper 1981
Denis Wright 1981 - 1988
David Baker 1988 - 1995
Howard Thomas 1995 - 2012
Robert Goodrich 2012 – 2020
Mike Webb 2012–2020 (Hon.)
Vacant 2021-

See also
List of English abbeys, priories and friaries serving as parish churches

References

External links 
Wymondham Abbey Homepage
 "St Mary and St Thomas of Canterbury, Wymondham", Norfolk Churches
 Norman pillars in Abbey nave

Church of England church buildings in Norfolk
Grade I listed churches in Norfolk
Grade I listed monasteries
Monasteries in Norfolk
Scheduled monuments in Norfolk
1107 establishments in England
Christian monasteries established in the 12th century
1538 disestablishments in England
Benedictine monasteries in England
Wymondham, Norfolk